Jessenia Alejandra Meneses González (born 18 June 1995) is a Colombian racing cyclist, who last rode for UCI Women's Team . She rode at the 2014 UCI Road World Championships.

References

External links

1995 births
Living people
Colombian female cyclists
Sportspeople from Medellín
20th-century Colombian women
21st-century Colombian women